= Tomb of Abu Usman Al-Maghribi =

Iranian national heritage site

- آرامگاه ابوعثمان مغربی
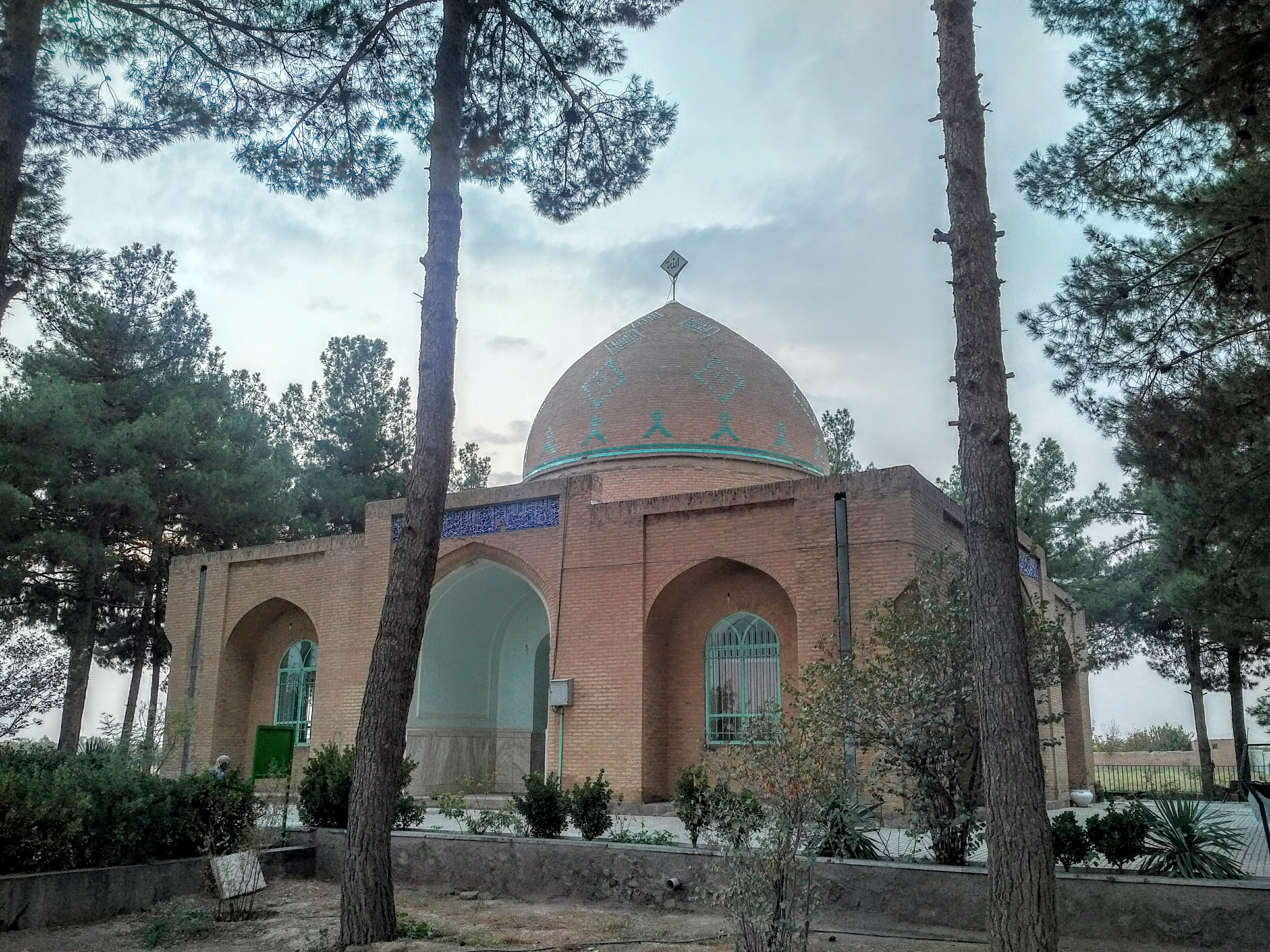
- Interactive map of the Tomb of Abu Usman Al-Maghribi area

General information
- Architectural style: Iranian architecture
- Location: Nishapur, Iran

The Tomb of Abu Usman Al-Maghribi (Persian: آرامگاه ابوعثمان مغربی) is located in Nishapur and was built by the Pahlavi dynasty.

== Gallery ==
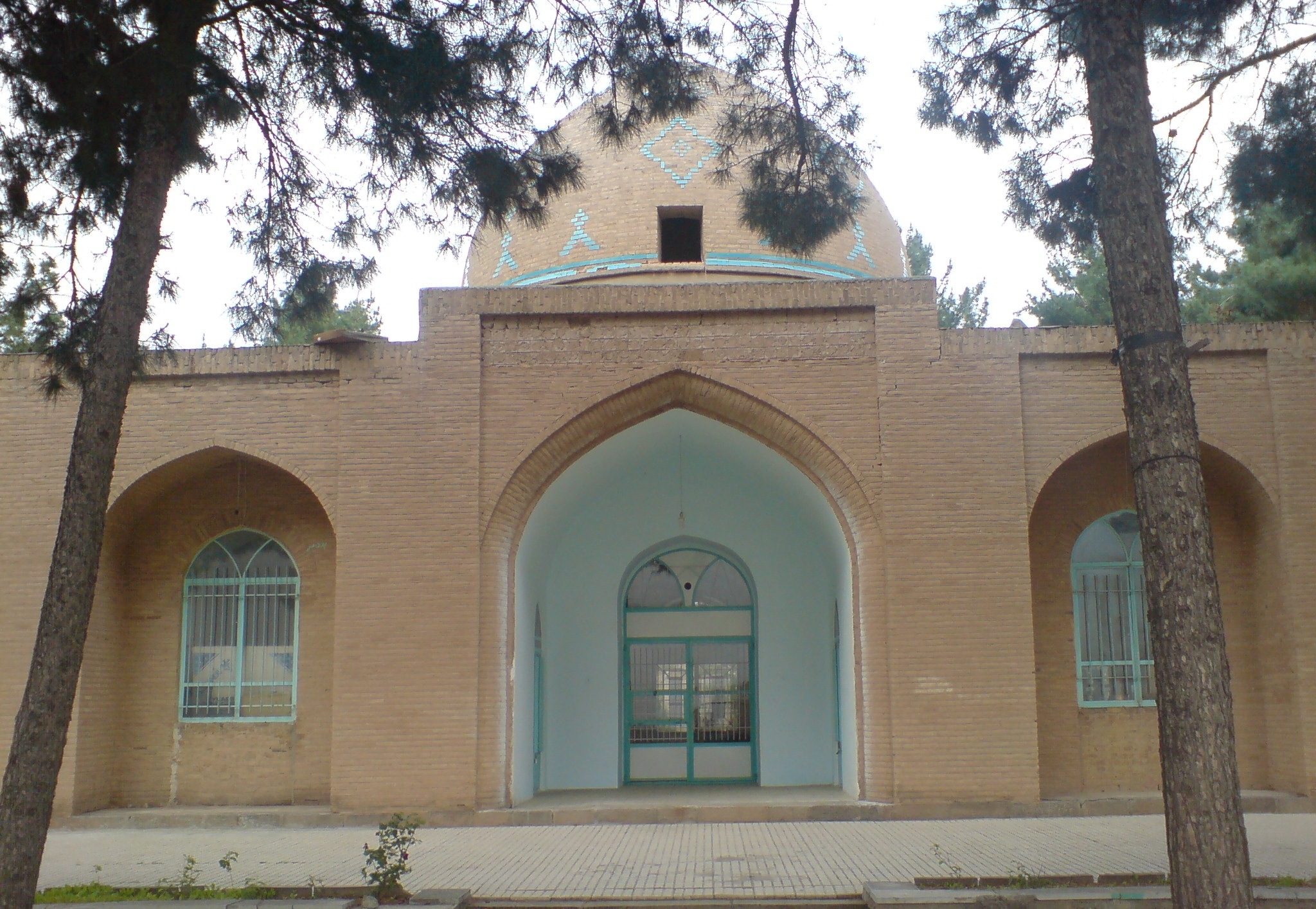

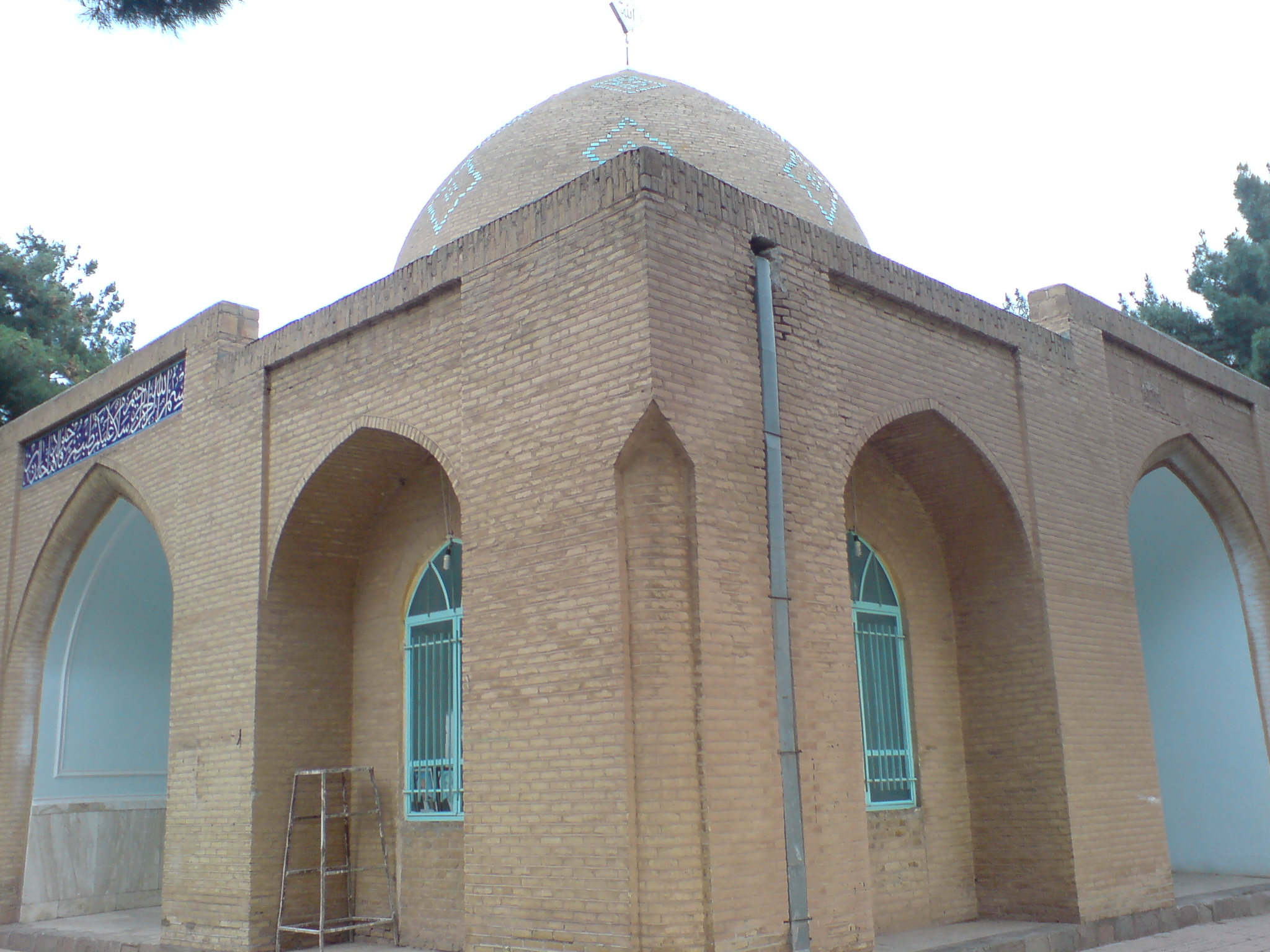

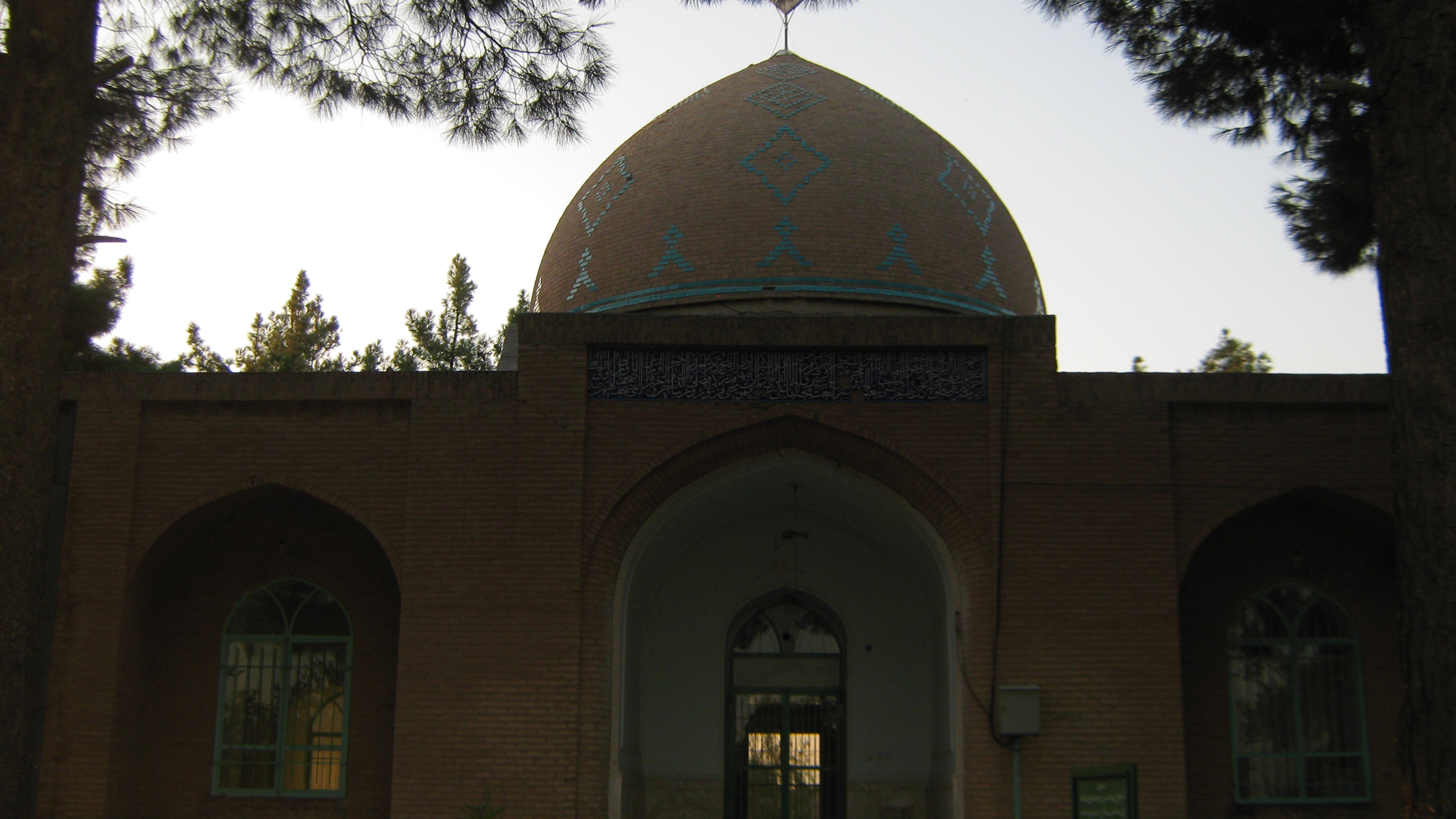

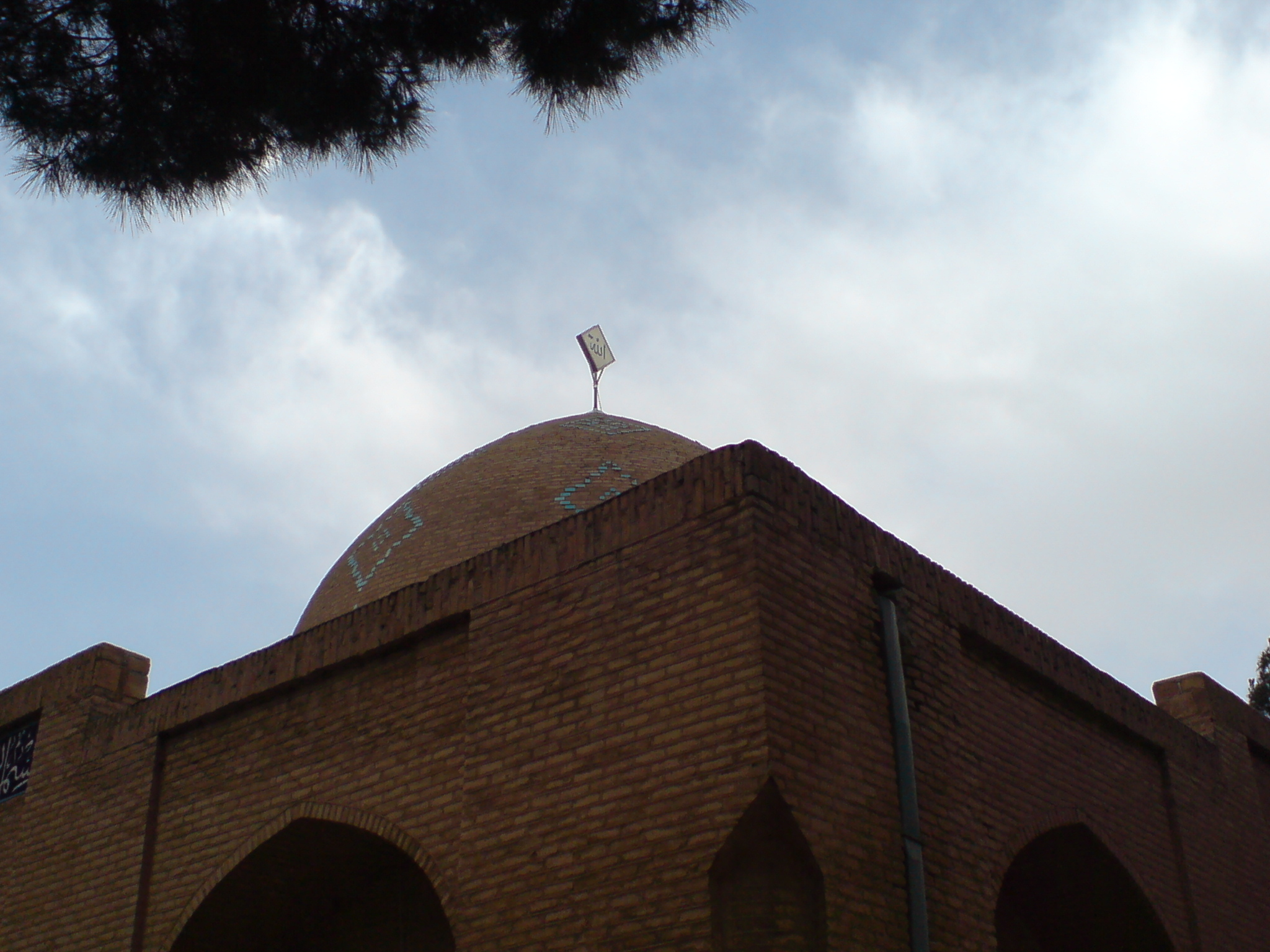

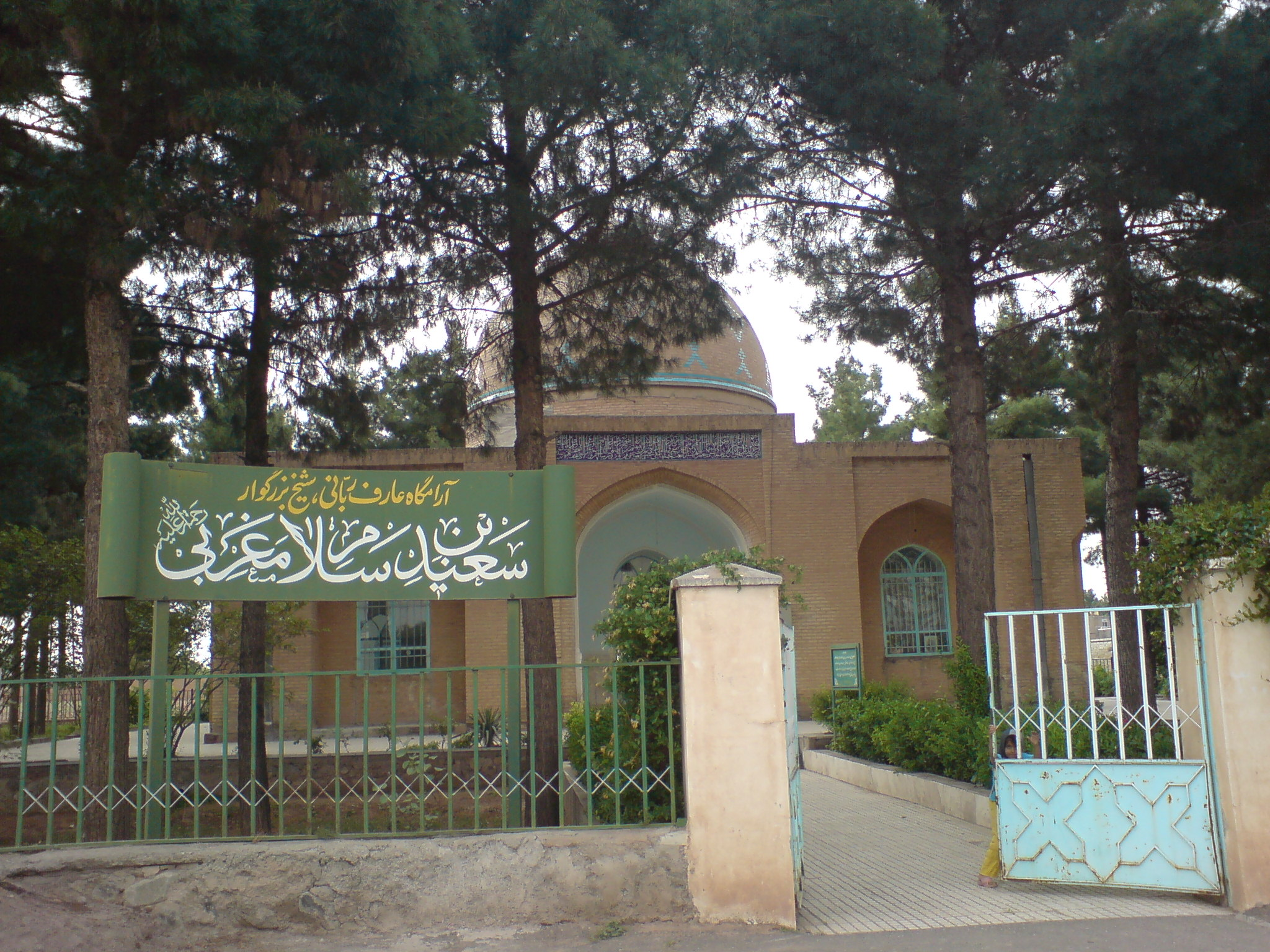

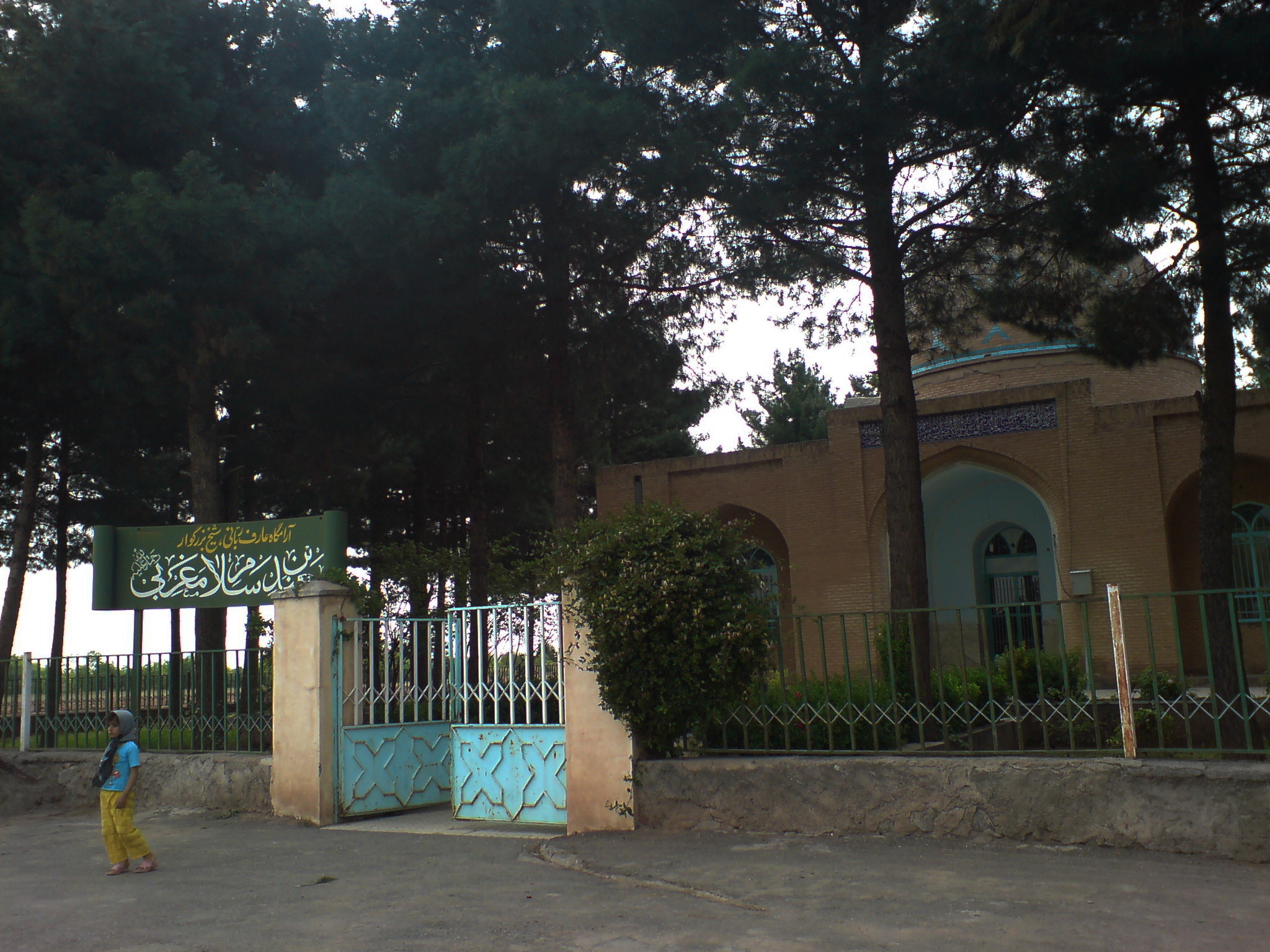

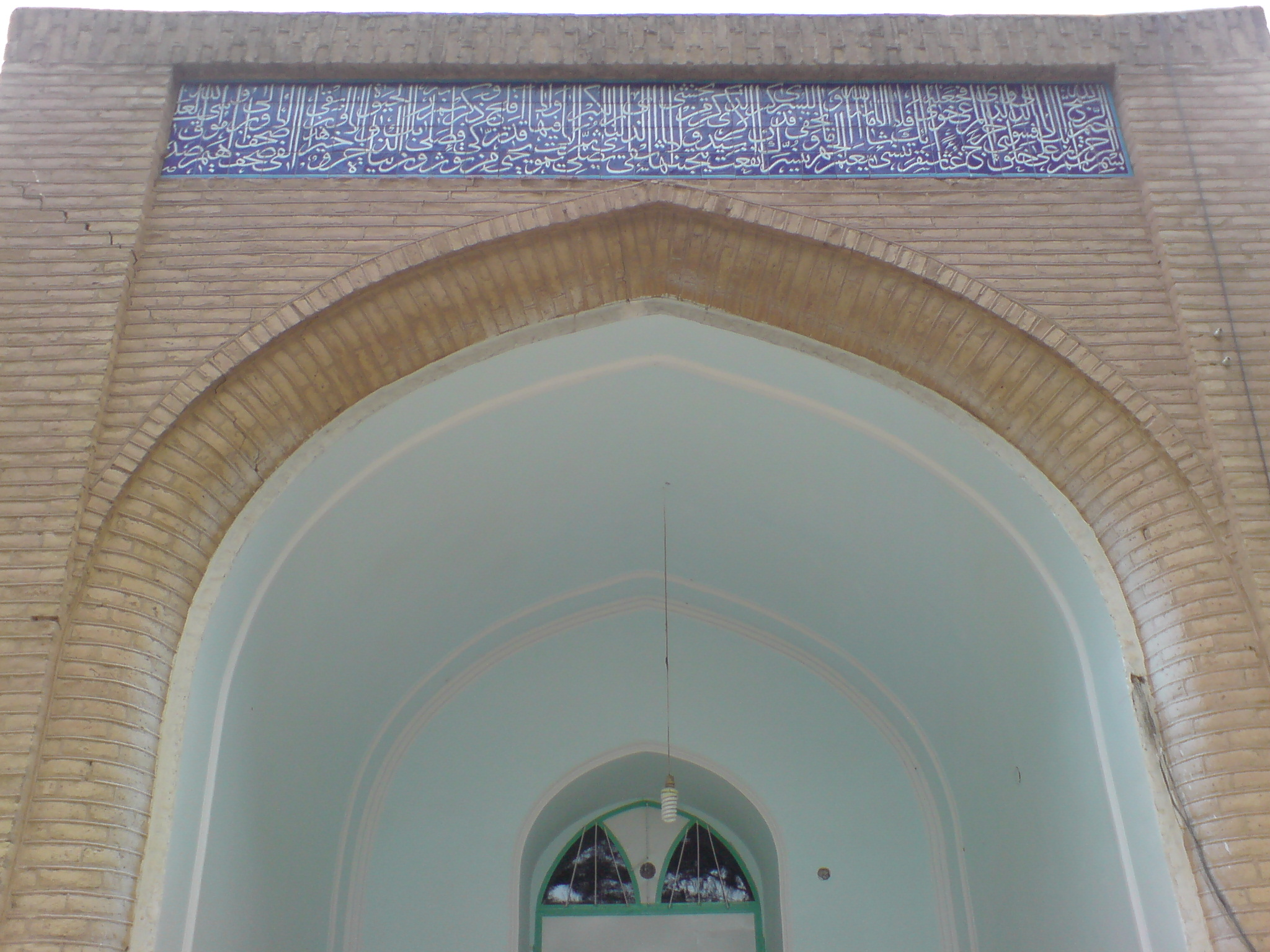

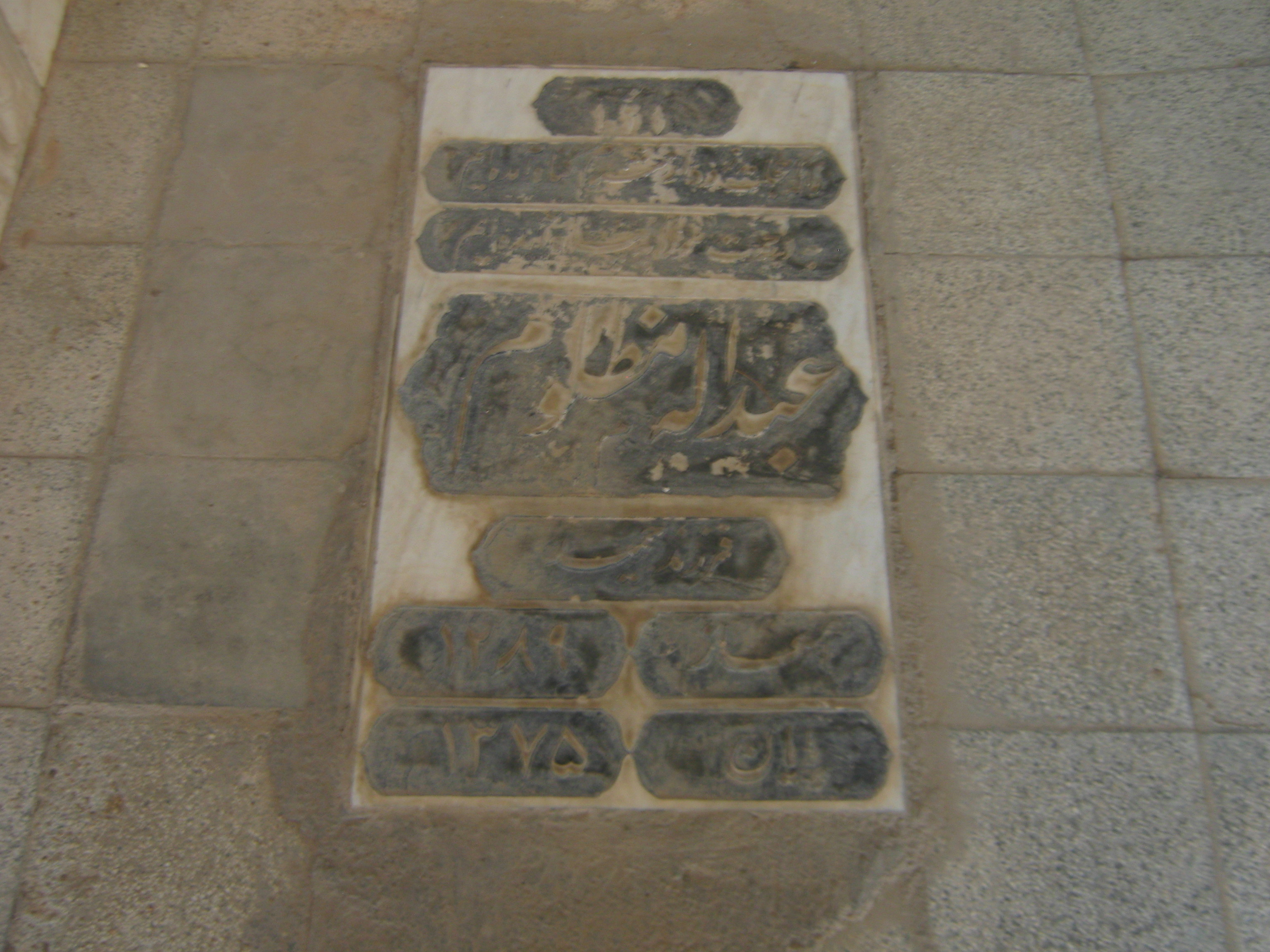
